Reymondia tanganyicensis is a species of freshwater snail in the family Paludomidae. It is endemic to Lake Tanganyika, where it is known from six locations within Burundi and Tanzania. It is threatened by pollution and sedimentation in the lake.

References

Paludomidae
Invertebrates of Burundi
Invertebrates of Tanzania
Gastropods of Africa
Freshwater snails
Gastropods described in 1889
Taxonomy articles created by Polbot